Lillian "Billie" Brockwell (née Voltaire; February 1, 1875 – January 30, 1949) was an early 20th-century American actress and scriptwriter.

Career 
After performing as a chorus girl in vaudeville, Brockwell entered the film industry in 1913, aged 38, and was continually cast as either a wife or mother. She appeared mainly in one-reel films that took around a week to produce. Her work for Keystone included Hogan Out West (1915) and The Village Vampire (1916). 

She returned to films in 1929 following the death of her daughter, actress Gladys Brockwell, in an automobile accident.

Personal life
Brockwell married H. R. Lindeman and had a daughter, Gladys Brockwell, who became an actress. 

The Brockwells performed together in 1912 productions by a company sponsored by the San Joaquin Valley Theatrical Managers' Association. Gladys was the leading woman, and Lillian portrayed a dance-hall girl.

Death 
She died of arterosclerosis on January 30, 1949, in Westwood, Los Angeles, two days before her 74th birthday. She was cremated and her remains are in the columbarium at Inglewood Park Cemetery on the outskirts of Los Angeles.

Film Roles
The Rattlesnake (1913) as Tony's mother (appearing as Lillian Brockwell)
His Blind Power (1913) (appearing as Lillian Brockwell)
Women and Roses (1914) as Wallace's mother (appearing as Lillian Brockwell)
The Siren (1914) as Renee's mother (appearing as Lillian Brockwell)
Den of Thieves (1914) as Lillian (appearing as Lillian Brockwell)
ThE Plumber (1914) as Mrs Felix
Ambrose's First Falsehood (1914) as a Floozie
Droppington's Family Tree (1915) as Mrs Droppington
Hogan's Wild Oates (1915) as Hogan's wife
Only a Messenger Boy (1915) as the Mayor's wife
When Ambrose Dared Walrus (1915) as Walrus's wife
A Hash House Fraud (1915) as the buyer's wife
These College Girls (1915) as the Headmistress
Gussle's Wayward Path (1915) as a Minister
The Village Vampire (1916) as the Adventuress
The Rent Jumpers (1915) as the Landlord's wife
His Luckless Love (1915) as the Wife
Love in Armor (1915) as a Party Guest with Charley Chase
Hogan Out West (1915) as Cactus Kate
Hogan's Aristocratic Dream (1915) as the Queen
Hogan's Romance Upset (1915) as the Love interest
Hogan, the Porter (1915) as wife of a Guest Receiving a Trunk
Hogan's Mussy Job (1915) as Wife in Apartment Below
Fatty and Mabel at the San Diego Exposition (1915) as a street crown participant (ncredited)
Hash House Mashers (1915) as the mother actress
Love Will Conquer (1916) as the Faded Vampire
Linda (1929) as Mrs Stillwater, Linda's mother

Scriptwriter

She wrote under the name of Lillian V. Brockwell.

A Law Unto Himself (1916)

References

1875 births
1949 deaths
American film actresses